Kalandadze is a Georgian surname. Notable people with the surname include:
Ana Kalandadze (1924–2008), Georgian poet
Giorgi Kalandadze (born 1980), retired Georgian Brigadier General
Helen Kalandadze, television presenter and singer from Georgia
Mariam Kalandadze (born 2000), Georgian footballer

Surnames of Georgian origin
Georgian-language surnames